The Mount Yarrowyck Nature Reserve is a protected nature reserve  that is located on the Northern Tablelands in the New England region of New South Wales, in eastern Australia.

Features
Located near the junction of the Armidale Road and Thunderbolts Way, the reserve protects an Aboriginal cave painting site and much of the natural environment of Mount Yarrowyck. The reserve's Aboriginal cultural walk, a  return track, runs along the granite slopes of the mountain to the cave painting site.

The track passes through one of the few remnants of natural bushland on the western slopes of the New England Tablelands. The walking track is clear and easy to follow and, apart from one short section, is level and undemanding.

See also

 Protected areas of New South Wales

References

Nature reserves in New South Wales
Forests of New South Wales
New England (New South Wales)
1983 establishments in Australia
Protected areas established in 1983
Uralla Shire